Sawi railway station is a railway station located in Na Pho Subdistrict, Sawi District, Chumphon. It is the railway station with the shortest name in Thailand.

Train services 
 Special Express 43/44 Bangkok-Surat Thani-Bangkok
 Special Express 39/40 Bangkok-Surat Thani-Bangkok
 Special Express 41/42 Bangkok-Yala-Bangkok
 Rapid 171/172 Bangkok-Sungai Kolok-Bangkok
 Rapid 173/174 Bangkok-Nakhon Si Thammarat-Bangkok
 Rapid 167/168 Bangkok-Kantang-Bangkok
 Rapid 177/178 Thon Buri-Lang Suan-Thon Buri
 Ordinary 254/255 Lang Suan-Thon Buri-Lang Suan
 Local 445/446 Chumphon-Hat Yai Junction-Chumphon

References 
 
 

Railway stations in Thailand